Michael Joseph Hopkins (November 1, 1872 – February 5, 1952) was a Major League Baseball catcher, at least for one day, during the 1902 season. He was born in Glasgow, Scotland. Nicknamed "Skinner", Hopkins is one of only eight players in major league history to be Scottish natives.

Hopkins played in one game for the Pittsburgh Pirates on August 24, 1902. Behind the plate, he handled four chances flawlessly for a fielding percentage of 1.000. He also had one passed ball. At the plate, he went 2-for-2 with a double for a 1.000 batting average and a slugging percentage of 1.500. The game was part of a doubleheader against the Cincinnati Reds, played at the Palace of the Fans in Cincinnati.

Some of his teammates on the pennant-winning 1902 Pirates were Hall of Famers Jack Chesbro, Fred Clarke, and Honus Wagner.

He died at the age of 79 in Pittsburgh, Pennsylvania.

References

External links

Retrosheet

Pittsburgh Pirates players
Major League Baseball catchers
Major League Baseball players from the United Kingdom
Major League Baseball players from Scotland
Scottish baseball players
Sportspeople from Glasgow
1872 births
1952 deaths